Cuisillos can refer to:

Cuisillos, Jalisco, a town in the municipality of Tala, Jalisco, Mexico
Banda Cuisillos, a Mexican banda (musical group)